Raad Hammoudi Salman al-Aredhi (born May 1, 1953) is a retired Iraqi football player who represented his country as a goalkeeper in the Olympics and the World Cup. He is known as being the most successful goalkeeper in Iraqi football, leading Iraq to the 1986 FIFA World Cup.
He made his international debut in 1976 against Turkey. Raad was an important part of the Al-Shorta side, captaining them to the Iraqi League in season 1979/80. He took three penalties for Al-Shorta, scoring two and missing one. He was goalkeeper of the tournament during Iraq's win in the 1979 Gulf Cup, when he conceded just one goal in six games, he was also in goal when Iraq won the Asian Games in 1982. Raad started his career in 1972 when he joined second division club Kuliya Al-Shurta (where he won the Iraqi Central Second Division), a team which along with Shurta Al-Najda and Aliyat Al-Shorta were replaced in the top-flight by Al-Shurta Sports Club.

Raad played in the 1984 Olympics and 1986 World Cup in Mexico, where he played in the two games against Paraguay and Belgium. In 1999, Raad was placed by the German-based Federation of Football History & Statistics (IFFHS) as Iraq's 4th best player of the century behind the likes of Ahmed Radhi, Hussein Saeed and Habib Jafar.

He is currently the president of the Iraqi Olympic Committee.

See also
 List of men's footballers with 100 or more international caps

References

Sportspeople from Baghdad
Iraqi footballers
1976 AFC Asian Cup players
1986 FIFA World Cup players
Iraq international footballers
Living people
Olympic footballers of Iraq
Footballers at the 1984 Summer Olympics
Asian Games medalists in football
Footballers at the 1982 Asian Games
FIFA Century Club
Al-Shorta SC players
1953 births
Asian Games gold medalists for Iraq
Association football goalkeepers
Medalists at the 1982 Asian Games